Sophie Traub is a Canadian actress born in 1989. Her roles include Lucy, in the short film, Pink (2003), June alongside co-star Johnny Knoxville in Daltry Calhoun (2005), Young Silvia in The Interpreter (2005) and Lori alongside co-star Russell Crowe in Tenderness (2009).

External links

References

1989 births
Canadian film actresses
Living people